Mohammed Al-Safri is a Saudi football player who currently plays as a midfielder for Jeddah.

References

External links 
 

Living people
1990 births
Saudi Arabian footballers
Al-Faisaly FC players
Al-Ahli Saudi FC players
Ettifaq FC players
Al-Hazem F.C. players
Al-Shoulla FC players
Hajer FC players
Jeddah Club players
Al-Jabalain FC players
Al-Qadsiah FC players
Saudi First Division League players
Saudi Professional League players
Association football midfielders